Çapalı is a village in the Şahinbey District, Gaziantep Province, Turkey. The village is inhabited Turkmens and had a population of 154 in 2022. The inhabitants are Alevis belonging to the Dede Kargın, Hacım Sultan and Baba Kaygusuz ocaks.

References

Villages in Şahinbey District